Zac Rae is an American musician, best known as the keyboardist, pianist, and multi-instrumentalist of the indie rock band Death Cab for Cutie, with whom he has recorded two studio albums and two EPs.

Rae is a former member of Alanis Morissette's backing band, which he joined in 2001 at the age of 21. While touring and recording with Morissette, Rae worked extensively as a session musician, recording with Macy Gray, Stevie Nicks, Ringo Starr, Ziggy Marley, Jane's Addiction, Miley Cyrus and Against Me! amongst others.

In 2015, Rae initially joined Death Cab for Cutie in a touring capacity, following the departure of founding member Chris Walla. In 2016, both he and touring guitarist Dave Depper were added to the band's core line-up. Rae's first studio album with the band, Thank You for Today was released in 2018.

Alongside his duties in Death Cab for Cutie, Rae continues to record as an in-demand studio session musician, contributing to Leonard Cohen's final two studio albums, You Want It Darker (2016) and Thanks for the Dance (2019), and appearing on albums by Lana Del Rey, Dua Lipa, Childish Gambino, Niall Horan, and Best Coast.

Early life
Rae began taking piano lessons at the age of five. During high school, he would seek out live musical opportunities: "When I was in high school, you could get a gig playing jazz for a couple hours at places like Barnes and Noble. So my friends and I would play in little quartets, and each get paid in $25 gift cards, which translated to about two CDs. Later as a teenager, I spent some time on the Cuban jazz circuit in Los Angeles, which was a lot of fun."

Rae studied at USC Thornton School of Music in Southern California for two years, before dropping out to find full-time work as a musician: "Shockingly, no one has ever passed me over for a gig because I didn't have a degree."

Career
Rae's professional career began in 1999: "Around the time I dropped out of music school in 1999, I met a group of more active musicians in LA and I started connecting and working with them. [...] One thing led to another and soon I was working full time doing session work, and then I got my first touring break with Alanis Morissette in 2001 when I was 21".

Discography
with Death Cab for Cutie
 Thank You for Today (2018)
 The Blue EP (2019)
 The Georgia EP (2020)
 Asphalt Meadows (2022)

with Alanis Morissette
 Feast on Scraps (2002)
 So-Called Chaos (2004)
 Jagged Little Pill Acoustic (2005)
 Havoc and Bright Lights (2012)

as a session musician

References

Living people
Death Cab for Cutie members
Atlantic Records artists
21st-century American keyboardists
Year of birth missing (living people)